Marat Grigorian (born 29 May 1991) is an Armenian-Belgian kickboxer currently signed to ONE Championship, where he competes in the featherweight division. Grigorian has previously competed for Glory and is a former Glory Lightweight Champion. He is famous for his technical aggressive fighting style and knockout power. Combat Press ranks him as the #2 lightweight and #4 pound-for-pound kickboxer in the world.

Background
Marat Grigorian was born on 29 May 1991 in Talin, Soviet Armenia and has three older sisters. The family moved to Germany when he was three years old, but were sent back to Armenia after three years in the country. After gathering funds by working multiple simultaneous odd jobs, the parents relocated the family to Antwerp, Belgium, when Marat was nine. In Belgium, Marat started training kickboxing in a nearby gym in his early adolescent years.

Kickboxing career

Glory
Marat trains at Hemmers Gym in the Netherlands. He has established himself as one of the rising stars of the Dutch circuit around the 70 kg weight category. According to Simon Rutz, the promoter of It's Showtime, Grigorian has a potential to be the next big star.

In 2011, Grigorian fought for the inaugural It's Showtime 73MAX world title, losing a close unanimous decision to Yohan Lidon. Grigorian did, however, become the youngest fighter to ever challenge for a Showtime title, at the age of 18.

He was set to face Mohamed Khamal at Glory 2: Brussels in Brussels, Belgium. However, Khamal pulled out of this bout citing personal issues and was replaced by Alex Vogel. He defeated Vogel via TKO due to low kicks in the second round.

Grigorian fought Chingiz Allazov at Glory 7: Milan in Milan, Italy on 20 April 2013. The bout ended in a no contest late in round one when Allazov was cut above the nose by an unintentional elbow. Grigorian won a rematch via decision on 14 December 2013.

He lost to Robin van Roosmalen via split decision in the co-main event of Glory 15: Istanbul in Istanbul, Turkey on 12 April 2014.

Grigorian took part in the Topking lightweight tournament, the quarterfinals of which were held at Topking World Series 2 on November 15, 2014. Despite beating Abraham Roqueñi by decision at this event and Seyedisa Alamdarnezam by decision at Topking World Series 3 on December 20, 2014, he later withdrew from the tournament.

Grigorian competed in the eight-man grand prix at the K-1 World GP 2015 -70kg Championship Tournament held in Tokyo, Japan on 4 July 2015. He defeated Yoichi Yamazaki and Makihira Keita by second-round knockouts in the quarter-finals and semi-finals, respectively, and defeated Jordan Pikeur by a first-round knockout in the finals to win the K-1 -70kg Championship.

In 2016, Grigorian fought Sitthichai Sitsongpeenong twice, with the first bout taking place in the Glory Lightweight Contender Tournament finals and the second bout being for the Glory Lightweight Championship held by Sitthichai. Grigorian lost both bouts by close decisions.

After twice falling short against Sitthichai, Grigorian faced Djime Coulibaly at Glory 30: Los Angeles on May 13, 2016. He won the fight by a first-round knockout, flooring Coulibaly with a head kick. Grigorian returned to China for his next fight, as he was booked to face Steve Moxon at The Legend of Emei 9 on June 5, 2016. He won the fight by a first-round technical knockout. Grigorian's next bout likewise took place under the Legend of Emei promotional banner, as he faced Mohamed El-Mir at their tenth event on July 9, 2016. He won the fight by a first-round technical knockout, extending his stoppage streak to three consecutive fights.

Grigorian was expected to face Hysni Beqiri in the co-main event of Glory 39: Brussels on March 25, 2017. Beqiri later withdrew for undisclosed reasons and was replaced by Anton Petrov. He won the fight by a second-round technical knockout. Grigorian faced Antonio Gomez at Glory 42: Paris on June 10, 2017. He won the fight by a second-round knockout.

Grigorian faced Jomthong Chuwattana, in a qualification bout for the Kunlun Fight lightweight tournament, at Kunlun Fight 65 - World MAX 2017 Final 16 on August 27, 2017. He won the fight by a second-round knockout. Grigorian faced Mohamed Mezouari in the quarterfinals at Kunlun Fight 67 - World MAX 2017 Final 8 on November 12, 2017. He won the fight by unanimous decision. Grigorian faced Dzianis Zuev in the penultimate bout of the tournament at Kunlun Fight 69 - World MAX 2017 on February 4, 2018. He once again won by unanimous decision. Grigorian faced Superbon Banchamek in the finals at Kunlun Fight 69 - World MAX 2017 on very same day. He won the fight by a first-round knockout, needing just 29 seconds to stop Superbon.

After beating Liu Xu by unanimous decision at Glory 54: Birmingham on June 2, 2018, Grigorian was booked to face Sitthichai Sitsongpeenong for the fourth time in his career, with Sitthichai's Glory Lightweight Championship on the line. Sitthichai once again prevailed, winning the fight by split decision.

In a fifth fight with Sitthichai Sitsongpeenong, Marat Grigorian defeated him at Glory 65 to win the title of Glory Lightweight Champion. Grigorian knocked Sitthichai down in the second round.

Grigorian made his first title defense against Tyjani Beztati at Glory 69: Düsseldorf on October 12, 2019. He won the fight by unanimous decision. Grigorian made his second and final title defense against the undefeated Elvis Gashi at Glory 73: Shenzhen on December 7, 2019. He retained the title by a fifth-round knockout.

ONE Championship
On August 23, 2020, news surfaced that Grigorian had signed with ONE Championship. He made his promotional debut against Ivan Kondratev at ONE Championship: Big Bang on December 4, 2020. After getting knocked down by Kondratev in the first round, Grigorian came back to win via second-round knockout.

Grigorian was scheduled to face Andy Souwer at ONE Championship: First Strike on October 15, 2021 in the quarterfinals of the ONE Featherweight Kickboxing World Grand Prix. He won the fight by second-round technical knockout.

Grigorian was expected to face Chingiz Allazov in the semifinals of the ONE Featherweight Kickboxing World Grand Prix at ONE Championship: Only the Brave on January 28, 2022. He withdrew from the bout after a positive COVID-19 test.

Grigorian challenged the reigning ONE Featherweight kickboxing champion Superbon Banchamek at ONE: X on March 25, 2022. He lost the fight by unanimous decision.

Grigorian was expected to face Tayfun Özcan at ONE on Prime Video 2 on September 30, 2022. On September 21, Özcan was rescheduled to challenge the reigning ONE Kickboxing Featherweight champion Superbon Singha Mawynn, while Grigorian was booked to face Jamal Yusupov. As both Superbon and Yusupov failed the pre-fight medical, Grigorian and Özcan were once again schedule to face each other on September 29. Grigorian won the fight by unanimous decision.

Personal life
Marat and his teammate Harut Grigorian are often mistaken to be brothers, however both have confirmed that they are good friends but not related.

Titles and accomplishments
Glory
Glory Lightweight Champion (one time; two defenses)
Kunlun Fight
Kunlun Fight World Max 2017 Tournament Champion
K-1
K-1 Super Welterweight Champion
K-1 World GP 2015 -70kg Championship Tournament Champion
WRSA
WRSA -73 kg World Champion
CombatPress.com
2018 Knockout of the Year vs. Superbon Banchamek
2019 Fight of the Year vs. Sitthichai Sitsongpeenong

Kickboxing record

|-  style="background:#cfc;"
| 2022-10-01 || Win ||align=left| Tayfun Ozcan || ONE on Prime Video 2 || Kallang, Singapore || Decision (Unanimous) || 3 || 3:00

|-  style="background:#fbb;"
| 2022-03-25|| Loss ||align=left| Superbon Banchamek || ONE: X || Kallang, Singapore || Decision (Unanimous) || 5 || 3:00
|-
! style=background:white colspan=9 |
|-
|- bgcolor="#CCFFCC"
|  2021-10-15 || Win || align="left" | Andy Souwer || ONE Championship: First Strike  || Kallang, Singapore || TKO (Leg Injury) || 2 || 2:26 
|-
! style=background:white colspan=9 |

|-  bgcolor="#CCFFCC"
| 2020-12-04 || Win ||align=left| Ivan Kondratiev || ONE Championship: Big Bang  || Kallang, Singapore || KO (Left hook to the body) || 2 || 1:52
|-  bgcolor="#CCFFCC"
| 2019-12-07||Win ||align=left| Elvis Gashi || Glory 73: Shenzhen || Shenzhen, China || KO (Punches) || 5 || 2:03  
|-
! style=background:white colspan=9 |
|-  bgcolor="#CCFFCC"
| 2019-10-12 || Win||align=left| Tyjani Beztati || Glory 69: Düsseldorf || Düsseldorf, Germany || Decision (Unanimous) || 5 || 3:00
|-
! style=background:white colspan=9 |
|-  bgcolor="#CCFFCC"
| 2019-05-17 || Win||align=left| Sitthichai Sitsongpeenong || Glory 65: Utrecht || Utrecht, Netherlands || Decision (Unanimous) || 5 || 3:00
|-
! style=background:white colspan=9 |
|-  bgcolor="#CCFFCC"
| 2018-12-08 || Win ||align=left| Christian Baya  || Glory 62: Rotterdam || Rotterdam, Netherlands || Decision (Split) || 3 || 3:00
|-  style="background:#fbb;"
| 2018-08-25 || Loss ||align=left| Sitthichai Sitsongpeenong || Glory 57: Shenzhen || Shenzhen, China || Decision (Split) || 5 || 3:00
|-
! style=background:white colspan=9 |
|-  bgcolor="#CCFFCC"
| 2018-06-02 || Win ||align=left| Liu Xu  || Glory 54: Birmingham || Birmingham, England || Decision (Unanimous) || 3 || 3:00
|-
|-  style="background:#cfc;"
| 2018-02-04 || Win ||align=left| Superbon Banchamek || Kunlun Fight 69 - World MAX 2017, Final || Guiyang, China || KO (Punches) || 1 || 0:29 
|-
! style=background:white colspan=9 | 
|-  style="background:#cfc;"
| 2018-02-04 || Win ||align=left| Dzianis Zuev || Kunlun Fight 69 - World MAX 2017, Semi Finals || Guiyang, China || Decision (Unanimous) || 3 || 3:00 
|-
|-  style="background:#cfc;"
| 2017-11-12 || Win ||align=left| Mohamed Mezouari || Kunlun Fight 67 - World MAX 2017 Final 8 || Sanya, China || Decision (Unanimous) || 3 || 3:00 
|-
! style=background:white colspan=9 |
|-  style="background:#cfc;"
| 2017-08-27 || Win ||align=left| Jomthong Chuwattana || Kunlun Fight 65 - World MAX 2017 Final 16 || Qingdao, China || KO (Right Cross) || 2 || 2:56
|-
! style=background:white colspan=9 |
|-  style="background:#cfc;"
| 2017-06-10 || Win ||align=left| Antonio Gomez || Glory 42: Paris|| Paris, France || KO (Knee to the body) || 2 || 2:02
|-
|-  style="background:#cfc;"
| 2017-03-25 || Win ||align=left| Anton Petrov || Glory 39: Brussels || Brussels, Belgium || TKO || 2 || 1:09
|-  style="background:#fbb;"
| 2016-12-10 || Loss ||align=left| Sitthichai Sitsongpeenong || Glory 36: Oberhausen || Oberhausen, Germany || Decision (Split) || 5 || 3:00
|-
! style=background:white colspan=9 |
|-
|-  style="background:#cfc;"
| 2016-07-09 || Win ||align=left| Mohamed El-Mir  || The Legend of Emei 10 || Nanchong , China || TKO (Referee Stoppage/Right High Kick) || 1 || 1:50 
|-  style="background:#cfc;"
| 2016-06-05 || Win ||align=left| Steve Moxon  || The Legend of Emei 9 || Chengdu, China || TKO (Referee Stoppage) || 1 || 2:40
|-
|-  style="background:#cfc;"
| 2016-05-13 || Win ||align=left| Djime Coulibaly || Glory 30: Los Angeles || Ontario, California || KO (head kick) || 1 || 1:56
|-
|-  style="background:#fbb;"
| 2016-03-12 || Loss ||align=left| Sitthichai Sitsongpeenong || Glory 28: Paris - Lightweight Contender Tournament, Final || Paris, France || Decision (Unanimous) || 3 || 3:00
|-
! style=background:white colspan=9 |
|-
|-  style="background:#cfc;"
| 2016-03-12 || Win ||align=left| Anatoly Moiseev || Glory 28: Paris - Lightweight Contender Tournament, Semi Finals || Paris, France || Decision (Unanimous) || 3 || 3:00
|-
|-  style="background:#fbb;"
| 2015-12-19|| Loss ||align=left| Sitthichai Sitsongpeenong || Kunlun Fight 35 - World MAX 2015 Final 8 || Luoyang, China || Decision (Majority) || 3 || 3:00
|-  style="background:#cfc;"
| 2015-07-04|| Win ||align=left| Jordann Pikeur || K-1 World GP 2015 -70kg Championship Tournament, Final || Tokyo, Japan || KO (punches) || 1 || 1:24
|-
! style=background:white colspan=9 |
|-  style="background:#cfc;"
| 2015-07-04|| Win ||align=left| Makihira Keita || K-1 World GP 2015 -70kg Championship Tournament, Semi Finals || Tokyo, Japan || KO (left body hook) || 2 || 2:00
|-  style="background:#cfc;"
| 2015-07-04|| Win ||align=left| Yoichi Yamazaki || K-1 World GP 2015 -70kg Championship Tournament, Quarter Finals || Tokyo, Japan || KO (Left High Kick) || 2 || 0:51
|-  style="background:#fbb;"
| 2015-06-05 || Loss ||align=left| Serhiy Adamchuk || Glory 22: Lille - Lightweight Contender Tournament, Reserve Match || Lille, France, || Decision (Unanimous) || 3 || 3:00
|-  style="background:#cfc;"
| 2015-05-23 || Win ||align=left| Nikos Gikas || VFC 2 °Coskun promotions°|| Antwerp, Belgium, ||KO (Right hook) || 1 ||0:30
|-
! style=background:white colspan=9 |
|-  style="background:#fbb;"
| 2015-04-12|| Loss ||align=left| Yodsanklai Fairtex || Kunlun Fight 22 || Changde, China || Decision || 3 || 3:00
|-  style="background:#cfc;"
| 2015-02-01 || Win ||align=left| Fernando Calzetta || Kunlun Fight 19 - Middleweight Tournament, Final || Guangzhou, China || TKO (Ref. stoppage) || 1 ||
|-
! style=background:white colspan=9 |
|-  style="background:#cfc;"
| 2015-02-01 || Win ||align=left| Aikpracha Meenayothin || Kunlun Fight 19 - Middleweight Tournament, Semi Finals || Guangzhou, China || KO (Right hook) || 2 ||
|-  style="background:#cfc;"
| 2014-12-20 || Win ||align=left| Seyedisa Alamdarnezam || Topking World Series 3 – 70 kg Tournament, Quarter Finals || Hong Kong, China || Decision (Unanimous) || 3 ||3:00 
|-  style="background:#cfc;"
| 2014-11-15 || Win ||align=left| Abraham Roqueñi || Topking World Series 2 – 70 kg Tournament, Final 16|| Paris, France || Decision || 3 ||3:00 
|-  style="background:#fbb;"
| 2014-04-12 || Loss ||align=left| Robin van Roosmalen || Glory 15: Istanbul || Istanbul, Turkey || Decision (Split) || 3 || 3:00
|-  style="background:#cfc;"
| 2013-12-14 || Win ||align=left| Chingiz Allazov || Victory || Levallois-Perret, France || Decision || 3 || 3:00
|- style="background:#c5d2ea;"
| 2013-04-20 || NC ||align=left| Chingiz Allazov || Glory 7: Milan || Milan, Italy || NC (Allazov cut by illegal elbow) || 1 || 
|-  style="background:#cfc;"
| 2012-10-06 || Win ||align=left| Alex Vogel || Glory 2: Brussels || Brussels, Belgium || TKO (Right Low Kick) || 2 || 
|-  style="background:#cfc;"
| 2012-06-30 || Win ||align=left| Aziz Kallah || Music Hall & BFN Group present: It's Showtime 57 & 58 || Brussels, Belgium || Decision (Unanimous) ||  3 || 3:00
|-  style="background:#cfc;"
| 2012-04-28 || Win ||align=left| Kenneth van Eesvelde || Rocky Gym Kickboxing Gala || Maldegem, Belgium || KO || 1 || 
|-  style="background:#cfc;"
| 2011-09-24 || Win ||align=left| Yassin Baitar || BFN Group & Music Hall presents: It's Showtime "Fast & Furious 70MAX" || Brussels, Belgium || Decision (Split) || 3 || 3:00
|-  style="background:#fbb;"
| 2011-05-14 || Loss ||align=left| Yohan Lidon || It's Showtime 2011 Lyon || Lyon, France || Decision (Unanimous) || 5 || 3:00
|-
! style=background:white colspan=9 |
|-  style="background:#cfc;"
| 2011-03-26 || Win ||align=left| Severiano Rijssel || BFN Group presents: It's Showtime Brussels || Brussels, Belgium || TKO (referee stoppage) || 2 || 2:13
|-  style="background:#cfc;"
| 2011-02-05 || Win ||align=left| Karim El Jouharte || 30th Gala "Black Panthers || Sint-Niklaas, Belgium || Decision || 3 || 3:00
|-  style="background:#cfc;"
| 2010-11-27 || Win ||align=left| Mickael Lallemand || La Nuit du Kick Boxing || Liège, Belgium || TKO (Referee Stoppage) || 3 || 
|-  style="background:#fbb;"
| 2010-02-06 || Loss ||align=left| Karim Ghajji || UKC France MAX, Semi Final || Dijon, France || Decision || 3 || 3:00
|-  style="background:#cfc;"
| 2010-02-06 || Win ||align=left| Hichem Chaïbi || UKC France MAX, Quarter Final || Dijon, France || Decision || 3 || 3:00
|-  style="background:#cfc;"
| 2009-11-21 || Win ||align=left| Soufiane Aouragh || It's Showtime 2009 Barneveld || Barneveld, Netherlands || TKO (Gave Up) || 2 || 
|-  style="background:#cfc;"
| 2009-10-24 || Win ||align=left| Mohammed Medhar || It's Showtime 2009 Lommel || Lommel, Belgium || TKO (Injury) || 2 || 
|-  style="background:#cfc;"
| 2009-05-16 || Win ||align=left| Tarik Mokhtar || It's Showtime 2009 Amsterdam || Amsterdam, Netherlands || Decision || 3 || 3:00
|-  style="background:#cfc;"
| 2009-03-14 || Win ||align=left| Tevfik Sucu || War of the ring || Sint-Job-in-'t-Goor, Belgium || TKO (Injury) || 4 || 
|-  style="background:#cfc;"
| 2009-02-08 || Win ||align=left| Marijn Geuens || Fights at the Border presents: It's Showtime 2009 || Antwerp, Belgium || TKO (Referee Stoppage, 3 Knockdowns) || 1 || 
|-  style="background:#cfc;"
| 2008-11-29 || Win ||align=left| Freddy van Duffelen || It's Showtime 2008 Eindhoven || Eindhoven, Netherlands || TKO (Referee Stoppage) || 1 || 
|-  style="background:#cfc;"
| 2008-09-06 || Win ||align=left| Daniel Corler || It's Showtime 2008 Alkmaar || Alkmaar, Netherlands || Decision || 5 || 3:00
|-  style="background:#cfc;"
| 2008-05-25 || Win ||align=left| Leroy Kaestner || Muay Thai Gala || Hoofddorp, Netherlands || TKO (Doctor stoppage) ||  || 
|-  style="background:#fbb;"
| 2008-04-12|| Loss ||align=left| Ludgens Saribekyan || New Blood 8 || Knesselare, Belgium || TKO (Referee Stoppage) || 2 ||
|-  style="background:#cfc;"
| 2007-10-27 || Win ||align=left| Halim Haryouli || One Night in Bangkok || Antwerp, Belgium || Decision ||  || 
|-  style="background:#cfc;"
| 2007-07-10 || Win ||align=left| Yavuz Kayabasi || Muaythai Gala in Reuver || Reuver, Netherlands || Decision ||  || 
|-
| colspan=9 | Legend:

See also
List of male kickboxers

References

External links
Glory profile

1991 births
Living people
Armenian male kickboxers
Belgian male kickboxers
Lightweight kickboxers
Middleweight kickboxers
Armenian Muay Thai practitioners
Belgian Muay Thai practitioners
Belgian people of Armenian descent
Armenian emigrants to Belgium
People from Aragatsotn Province
Sportspeople from Antwerp
Glory kickboxers
Kunlun Fight kickboxers
ONE Championship kickboxers
Kunlun Fight kickboxing champions